Body to Body, Job to Job (stylized on the cover as Body To Body Job To Job.) is the third compilation album by the American no wave/noise rock band Swans.  It was released simultaneously on LP, CD and audio cassette in 1991. It presents various live recordings, tape loops and previously unavailable material recorded between 1982 and 1985. The title is taken from the song "Job".

Release history
While the original CDs and audio cassettes contained 16 songs, the LP version – due to the limited length of the medium – omitted 4 songs: "Whore", "Loop 21", "Get Out" and "Mother, My Body Disgusts Me".

While the album, in its initial form, would eventually go out of print, it has been reissued various times. It was included on the double-disc set Filth/Body to Body, Job to Job in 1999 (which also included the band's 1983 recording Filth), and it was also included in the 2015 deluxe triple-disc reissue of Filth. The 2015 reissue of Filth containing Body to Body, Job to Job adds "Raping a Slave (Live Berlin 1984)" as a bonus track after the end of "Thug".

Content
"Whore" was originally released on the album Cop in 1984 as "Butcher"; the disparity indicates that the song's title may have been taken from an early setlist. "Your Game" is an early version of the song "Your Property," which originally appeared on Cop as well; the lyric at this time was a spoken word piece titled "Your Game" that was later collected in Gira's book The Consumer. "Mother, My Body Disgusts Me" is an early version of the title track from Greed, with different lyrics. The recordings used for the album were remastered by Gira at B. Monster Studios, New York City.

The CD and cassette edition track listings reveal the year of origin for each track, with the exception of "Loop 33".

Track listing

Personnel
Credits adapted from liner notes for Body to Body, Job to Job.

Swans
Norman Westberg
Michael Gira
Harry Crosby
Sue Hanel
Roli Mossimann
Mojo
Dan Braun
Thurston Moore
Craig Crafton
Jonathan Kane
Ted Parsons
Ronaldo Gonzalez
Ivan Nahem
Algis Kizys
Jarboe
Bob Pezzola
Johnathan Prosser

Production
Michael Gira - production, remastering, cover design
Bryce Goggin - engineering
Catherine Ceresole - recording (tracks 2, 6, 10, and 15)
Nathan Ceresole - recording (tracks 2, 6, 10, and 15)
John Erskine - recording (tracks 6, 8, 11, 14, and 16)
Patricia Mooney - layout

Charts

References

External links
 

1991 compilation albums
Swans (band) compilation albums
Young God Records compilation albums